Public holidays and statutory holidays in Hong Kong are holidays designated by the Government of Hong Kong. They allow workers rest from work, usually in conjunction with special occasions.

List of holidays
The 17 public holidays, also called bank holidays, are set by the General Holidays Ordinance.

According to the Employment Ordinance, 13 of the 17 public holidays are compulsory for employers to give to the employees. These 13 holidays are known as statutory holidays, labour holidays, or factory holidays. These are highlighted in beige below.

Operation of statutory holidays 
If an employer states in the employment contract that its employees are only allowed to take statutory holidays, it is legal to require the employees to work on public holidays that are not statutory holidays (i.e. Good Friday, the day following Good Friday, Easter Monday, Buddha's Birthday and the day following Christmas) without salary or leave compensations.

Traditionally, statutory holidays are an entitlement associated with blue-collar jobs in fields such as manufacturing, construction, textiles and clothing, repairing, mass media, security, cleaning, transportation, logistics, distribution, retailing, catering, labourer, hotel and customer service.

Previous holidays 
Under the administration of the United Kingdom prior to 1997, the Queen's Birthday was a public holiday observed in the second Monday of June. It was replaced by the Hong Kong Special Administrative Region Establishment Day after the transfer of sovereignty to the People's Republic of China. Similarly, Commonwealth Day was a school holiday prior to the transfer of sovereignty, as is the birthday anniversary of Dr. Sun Yat Sen. The anniversary of the liberation of Hong Kong was observed on the last Monday in August, and the preceding day was also observed as anniversary of the victory in the Second Sino-Japanese War. After the transfer of sovereignty, the two public holidays were replaced with Labour Day and the National Day of the People's Republic of China.

Weekends and days in lieu 
According to Hong Kong laws, when a designated public holiday falls on a Sunday or on the same day of another holiday, the immediate following weekday would be a public holiday. However, there are exceptions; for example, as Lunar New Year 2007 falls on a Sunday (18 February), the government have designated the Saturday directly before (17 February) as a public holiday. However, this does not apply to Saturdays, and when a non-statutory public holiday falls on a Saturday, the public holiday is lost to people that do not work on Saturdays.

In general, if a statutory holiday falls on the employee's rest day, the employer is committed to giving a day off-in-lieu at a following day which isn't the employee's rest day. For example, under the 5-day work week system, if a statutory holiday falls on a Saturday, the employee can be entitled to a day off-in-lieu.  This is not true for non-statutory public holidays which are lost to people that do not work on Saturday.

See also
 Traditional Chinese holidays
 Public holidays in Macau

References

GovHK: General holidays for 2010

External links
Hong Kong public holidays list on government web site
 General Holidays Ordinance
LegCo papers concerning the Liberation Day

 
Hong Kong
Lists of public holidays by country